is a 2015 Japanese jidaigeki drama film directed by Masato Harada. It was released in Japan on May 16, 2015.

Cast
Yo Oizumi as Shinjirō Nakamura
Erika Toda as Jogo
Hikari Mitsushima as Ogin
Rina Uchiyama as Yū Togasaki
Hana Hizuki as Hōshūni
Midoriko Kimura as Okatsu
Katsumi Kiba as Rihei
Katsuo Nakamura as Kaze no Kinbei

Production
Kakekomi's screenplay was based on the novel Tokeiji Hanadayori by Hisashi Inoue.

The film was shot at Engyō-ji Temple in Himeji. Director Masato Harada first saw the location while filming The Last Samurai.

Reception
On its opening weekend the film grossed  at the Japanese box office. Zahraa Mubarak of 'High on Films' Website called Kakekomi "a shocking and intense experience" in her review of the film.

References

External links
 
 駆込み女と駆出し男(2015) at allcinema 
 駆込み女と駆出し男 at KINENOTE 

Films directed by Masato Harada
Japanese drama films
Jidaigeki films
2015 drama films
2015 films
2010s Japanese films